who goes by the ring name , is a Japanese professional wrestler from Moriguchi, Osaka Prefecture, who works for Dradition. He has previously worked for All Japan Pro Wrestling.

Career
Takagi was initially a sumo wrestler under the name of Takuetsuyama (previously Maenohikari). He joined Takadagawa stable, run by former ozeki Maenoyama, in 1977. He reached elite sekitori status upon promotion to the second highest jūryō division in July 1985, but was demoted back to the unsalaried makushita division after only four tournaments. In 1986, at the age of 24, he decided to quit sumo and joined All Japan Pro Wrestling (AJPW) upon an offer from owner Giant Baba. He made his debut in 1987. The same year he accompanied Baba to an excursion into Jim Crockett Promotions, where they competed in the Jim Crockett Sr. Memorial Cup Tag Team Tournament. They made it into the semifinals before being defeated by eventual runners-up Lex Luger and Tully Blanchard.

Takagi remained a strong member of the undercard, feuding with dojo classmates Akira Taue, Kenta Kobashi, Tsuyoshi Kikuchi and Tatsumi Kitahara. In 1990, however, he decided to follow former sumo wrestler Genichiro Tenryu out of AJPW and into a new promotion, Super World of Sports (SWS). Takagi was fired from SWS in early 1991, with the company claiming he missed too many training sessions due to claimed injuries and he spent too much time gambling. Afterwards, Takagi wandered in the independents until settling down in the successor promotion, WAR.

In WAR he adopted the name Arashi (storm), originally a masked gimmick used by also former rikishi Daikokubō Benkei. His first success came teaming with Koki Kitahara (formerly known as Tatsumi), and with Nobutaka Araya, formerly of International Wrestling Association of Japan, to win the WAR 6-Man Tag Team Championship.

In 1998, as WAR went into decline due to Tenryu making a comeback in New Japan Pro-Wrestling, Arashi went to Yoshiaki Yatsu's SPWF promotion. He stayed there until Tenryu called him back to AJPW in 2001. Initially he supported Tenryu's WAR faction, but after Tenryu left yet again, aligned himself with Keiji Mutoh, and won the World Tag Team Championship with him in 2003. On December 27, he and Muto (under his Great Muta persona) defeated Christopher Daniels and Dan Maff to retain the title at an ROH vs. All Japan card.

Arashi made the finals of the Champion Carnival the same year, where he fell to Satoshi Kojima. He received a shot at Triple Crown Heavyweight Champion Shinya Hashimoto, but was defeated.

After he and Mutoh lost the World Tag Team Championship to Kojima and Kaz Hayashi, Arashi was relegated back to the mid-card.

In September 2006, after a trial on drug charges, Takagi was sentenced to three years in prison. Freed after serving a portion of his sentence, Takagi returned to professional wrestling, working in Tatsumi Fujinami's Muga World (now Dradition) promotion. In 2007, Takagi appeared during a match under his real name for the first time since 1993. He's since brought back his real name as a ring name periodically.

Championships and accomplishments
All Japan Pro Wrestling
All Asia Tag Team Championship (2 times) – with Koki Kitahara (1) and Nobutaka Araya (1)
World Tag Team Championship (1 time) – with Keiji Mutoh
January 2 Korakuen Hall Heavyweight Battle Royal (2006) 
Apache Army
WEW Heavyweight Championship (1 time)
Tenryu Project
Tenryu Project 6-Man Tag Team Championship (2 times) – with Suwama and Tomohiro Ishii (1) and Genichiro Tenryu and Tomohiro Ishii (1)
Wrestle Association "R"
WAR World Six-Man Tag Team Championship (1 time) – with Koki Kitahara and Nobutaka Araya

Sumo career record

References

External links
 Article of him caught with cannabis.

Japanese male professional wrestlers
Japanese sumo wrestlers
1961 births
People from Moriguchi, Osaka
Living people
20th-century professional wrestlers
21st-century professional wrestlers

All Asia Tag Team Champions
World Tag Team Champions (AJPW)
Tenryu Project World 6-Man Tag Team Champions
WEW Heavyweight Champions